Kerstin Toußaint (also shown as Toussaint) is a German rower, who competed for the SG Dynamo Potsdam / Sportvereinigung (SV) Dynamo. She won the medals at the international rowing competitions, including a bronze medal at the 1985 World Rowing Championships.

References 

Year of birth missing (living people)
Living people
East German female rowers
World Rowing Championships medalists for East Germany